Ribes montigenum is a species of currant known by the common names mountain gooseberry, alpine prickly currant, western prickly gooseberry, and gooseberry currant. It is native to western North America from Washington south to California and east as far as the Rocky Mountains, where it grows in high mountain habitat types in subalpine and alpine climates, such as forests and talus. It is a spreading shrub growing up to 1.5 meters (5 feet) tall, the branching stems covered in prickles and hairs and bearing 1 to 5 sharp spines at intervals.

The lightly hairy, glandular leaves are up to 4 centimeters (1.6 inches) long and are divided into about five deeply cut or toothed lobes. Each is borne on a petiole several centimeters in length. The inflorescence is a raceme of several flowers. Each flower has five sepals in shades of yellow-green or pale pink, orange, or yellow which spread into a corolla-like star. At the center are five smaller club-shaped red petals and purple-red stamens tipped with yellowish or cream anthers. The fruit is an acidic but tasty bright-red to orange-red edible berry up to a centimeter long, which is usually covered in soft bristles. It has only a small dried flower remnant at the end, compared with the long remnant found on wax currants (Ribes cereum).

References

External links

Jepson Manual Treatment
Calphotos Photo gallery, University of California

montigenum
Edible fruits
Plants described in 1894
Flora of the Western United States
Flora without expected TNC conservation status